Internet safety or online safety or cyber safety and E-Safety is trying to be safe on the internet and is the act of maximizing a user's awareness of personal safety and security risks to private information and property associated with using the internet, and the self-protection from computer crime.

As the number of internet users continues to grow worldwide, internets, governments, and organizations have expressed concerns about the safety of children and teenagers using the Internet. Over 45% have announced they have endured some sort of cyber-harassment. Safer Internet Day is celebrated worldwide in February to raise awareness about internet safety. In the UK the Get Safe Online campaign has received sponsorship from government agency Serious Organized Crime Agency (SOCA) and major Internet companies such as Microsoft and eBay.

Information security
Sensitive information such as personal information and identity, passwords are often associated with personal property and privacy and may present security concerns if leaked. Unauthorized access and usage of private information may result in consequences such as identity theft, as well as theft of property. Common causes of information security breaches include:

Phishing
Phishing is a type of scam where the scammers disguise themselves as trustworthy source in an attempt to obtain private information such as passwords, credit card information, etc. through the internet. These fake websites are often designed to look identical to their legitimate counterparts to avoid suspicion from the user. Normally, hackers will send third-party email to target requesting personal information, and they will use this as an entry point to implement attack.

Malware
Malware, particularly spyware, is malicious software designed to collect and transmit private information, such as passwords, without the user's consent or knowledge. They are often distributed through e-mail, software, and files from unofficial locations. Malware is one of the most prevalent security concerns as often it is impossible to determine whether a file is infected, regardless of the source of the file.

Personal safety
The growth of the internet gave rise to many important services accessible to anyone with a connection. One of these important services is digital communication. While this service allowed communication with others through the internet, this also allowed communication with malicious users. While malicious users often use the internet for personal gain, this may not be limited to financial/material gain. This is especially a concern to parents and children, as children are often targets of these malicious users. Common threats to personal safety include phishing, internet scams, malware, cyberstalking, cyberbullying, online predators, and sextortion.

Cyberstalking
Cyberstalking is the use of the Internet or other electronic means to stalk or harass an individual, group, or organization. It may include false accusations, defamation, slander and libel. It may also include monitoring, identity theft, threats, vandalism, solicitation for sex, or gathering information that may be used to threaten, embarrass or harass. Cyberstalking is a crime in which someone harasses or stalks a victim using electronic or digital means, such as social media, email, instant messaging (IM), or messages posted to a discussion group or forum. ... The terms cyberstalking and cyberbullying are often used interchangeably.

Cyberbullying
Cyberbullying is the use of electronic means such as instant messaging, social media, e-mail and other forms of online communication with the intent to abuse, intimidate, or overpower an individual or group. Over the past decade, cyberbullying has been identified as a significant problem for youth. In a 2012 study of over 11,925 students in the United States, it was indicated that 23% of adolescents reported being a victim of cyberbullying, 30% of which reported experiencing suicidal behavior. The Australian eSafety Commissioner's website reports that 20% of young Australians report being socially excluded, threatened or abused online.

Sometimes, this takes the form of posting unverifiable and illegal libelous statements on harassment websites.  These websites then run advertisements encouraging the victims to pay thousands of dollars to related businesses to get the posts removed – temporarily, as opposed to the free and permanent removal process available through major web search engines.

Child-on-child abuse (peer-on-peer abuse) that happens online often falls under cyberbullying. However, it goes much further. It can include physical and sexual abuse or harassment, relationships abuse, grooming and more.

Online predation
Online predation is the act of engaging an underage minor in inappropriate sexual relationships through the internet. Online predators may attempt to initiate and seduce minors into relationships through the use of chat rooms or internet forums.

Online grooming 
Online grooming usually refers to child sexual abuse but can also refer to radicalisation, drug trafficking, and financial gain. Grooming is when a stranger targets a child by befriending them and gaining their trust. Once they gain this trust, the groomer can manipulate the child to do what they want, which may include sending sexual images, running drugs, or any number of other activities.

Obscene/offensive content
Various websites on the internet content material that some deem offensive, distasteful or explicit, which may often be not of the user's liking. Such websites may include internet, shock sites, hate speech or otherwise inflammatory content. Such content may manifest in many ways, such as pop-up ads and unsuspecting links.

Sextortion
Sextortion, especially via the use of webcams, is a concern, especially for those who use webcams for flirting and cybersex. Often this involves a cybercriminal posing as someone else - such as an attractive person - initiating communication of a sexual nature with the victim. The victim is then persuaded to undress in front of a webcam, and may also be persuaded to engage in sexual behaviour, such as masturbation. The video is recorded by the cybercriminal, who then reveals their true intent and demands money or other services (such as more explicit images of the victim, in cases of online predation), threatening to publicly release the video and send it to family members and friends of the victim if they do not comply. A video highlighting the dangers of sextortion has been released by the National Crime Agency in the UK to educate people, especially given the fact that blackmail of a sexual nature may cause humiliation to a sufficient extent to cause the victim to take their own life, in addition to other efforts to educate the public on the risks of sextortion.

See also

 Control software:
Accountability software
Content control software
 Identity fraud
 Internet crime
 Internet fraud
 Internet security 
 Procurement through online dating services
 Website reputation rating tools

Groups and individuals working on the topic
 AHTCC – Australian High Tech Crime Centre
 Childnet
 Insafe
 Internet Matters
 Sonia Livingstone
 ThinkUKnow
 Tween summit
 Youth Internet Safety Survey

References

External links
 
 Types of abuse seen on the internet 

 
Crime prevention
Internet culture